Pseudochapsa lueckingii is a species of corticolous (bark-dwelling), crustose lichen in the family Graphidaceae. It is known only from a single collection in São Paulo, Brazil.

Taxonomy
The lichen was first formally described as a new species in 2009 by Klaus Kalb. The species epithet honours his colleague Robert Lücking, "for his outstanding contributions to tropical lichenology". The taxon was transferred in 2012 to Pseudochapsa, a segregate genus of Chapsa, characterised by the brown colour of its .

Description
Pseudochapsa lueckingii has a smooth, olive-green thallus with a 3–10 μm-thick, hyaline cortical layer. It has large, more-or-less round apothecia measuring 0.7–2 mm in diameter with a pale brown  covered with white . Ascospores typically have between 5 and 7 transverse septa, and measure 17–25 by 6–7 μm. The lichen contains stictic acid as a major metabolite and minor amounts of constictic acid. Kalb suggests that the Panamanian species Pseudochapsa pseudoschizostoma is closely related; this species differs from P. lueckingii in lacking a cortex and in its much smaller apothecia.

References

Graphidaceae
Lichen species
Lichens described in 2009
Taxa named by Klaus Kalb
Lichens of Southeast Brazil